Martna is a village in Lääne-Nigula Parish Lääne County western Estonia. It was the administrative centre of Martna Parish.

References

Villages in Lääne County
Kreis Wiek